Street of the Younger Son is a 1962 Soviet drama film directed by  based on the novel with the same name by Lev Kassil and  about Soviet partisan Volodia Dubinin.

Plot 
The film tells about a boy named Volodya from Kerch, who is fond of literature about Chkalov, constructs the best gliders, goes fishing with his father and becomes a partisan when the war begins.

Cast 
 Boris Bityukov
 Zhenya Bondarenko as Vanya
 Valentin Chernyak
 Zinaida Dekhtyaryova
 Evgeniy Grigorev as Lankin, podpolshchik
 Boris Kordunov
 Sasha Kornev as Volodya Dubinin
 Tanya Kresik as Svetlana
 Pavel Pekur
 Ivan Shatillo
 Tamara Muzhenko as Commander Lazarev's wife

References

External links 
 

1962 films
1960s Russian-language films
Soviet drama films
1962 drama films